Undeniable is the second (and first independently released) studio album by American singer Raven-Symoné. Although her first album was full of kid-rap, she used this album to display her vocal ability while still holding true to her roots in rap. The album was released on May 4, 1999 and as of February 2007 has sold over 2,000 copies.

Background 
After the lack of success with her debut, Here's to New Dreams, Raven was dropped from MCA Records in 1994. After a short break, she co-founded RayBlaize Records with her father, Christopher Pearman in 1996, and signed a deal with Crash Records in 1997. The song "Pure Love" was written by first season American Idol contestant EJay Day, and the song "I Love You" was written by Stevie Wonder. The album features the single "With a Child's Heart", also a Stevie Wonder song. While her previous album was primarily rap, this album focused more on her vocal chops while still holding true to her old roots.  The original album was given a very limited CD and cassette release. Because of the rarity of this album, the original edition often sells for $40 and up on eBay and other online stores. This album, in terms of sales, did worse than her previous record despite new kinds of promotion such as opening for 'N Sync. She was dropped from Crash Records in 2000, and the following year she sold her share of RayBlaize.

Promotion 
Raven-Symoné was an opening act for 'N Sync's first tour, the 1998-1999 'N SYNC Tour. One single was released, "With a Child's Heart", a Stevie Wonder song. It spawned three music videos, one for each version of the song.

Track listing 
 "With a Child's Heart (Uptempo Version)" (Blaze, Jefferson) – 3:53
 "I Can Get Down" (Blaize, Jefferson, Ray Blaze) – 4:01
 "Hip Hoppers" (Holt, Jefferson) – 4:18
 "Slow Down" (Jefferson) – 4:52
 "Best Friends" (Jerome "Rome" Jefferson, Pierce La Kindra, Raven-Symoné) – 4:18
 "People Make the World Go Round" (Thomas Creed, Linda Creed) – 4:15
 "Bounce" (Jefferson) – 4:41
 "I Love You" (Wonder) – 4:51
 "Lean on Me" (Blaize, Jefferson, Ray Blaze) – 4:07
 "With a Child's Heart (Ballad Version)" (Vickie Basemore, Henry Cosby, Silvia Moore) – 5:34
 "Pure Love" (Day, Rogers, Sawyer, Smith) – 3:31
"With a Child's Heart (Bonus Remix Uptempo Version)" (Blaze, Jefferson) – 3:38
"With a Child's Heart (International Bonus House Mix)" (Blaze, Jefferson) – 4:21

Charts

References 

1999 albums
2006 albums
Raven-Symoné albums